Cécé Franck Pepe (born 9 November 1996) is a French professional footballer who plays as a defender, most recently for Scottish club Livingston whom he left in August 2020.

Career
Born in Clichy, Hauts-de-Seine, Pepe is a product of the Paris Saint-Germain youth system. In 2014 he transferred to Marseille, but played only for the reserve team in the Championnat National 2.

Zirka Kropyvnytskyi
In August 2017 Pepe signed a two-year contract with Ukrainian Premier League club Zirka Kropyvnytskyi. He made his debut in the Ukrainian Premier League for FC Zirka on 11 August 2017, playing in a match against FC Dynamo Kyiv.

Rieti
On 30 August 2018, Pepe signed a two-year contract with Italian Serie C side Rieti. He was released from his contract by mutual consent on 11 February 2019.

Livingston
In June 2019 he signed for Scottish club Livingston. On 21 August 2020, he was released by the club.

References

External links 

1996 births
Living people
Sportspeople from Clichy, Hauts-de-Seine
French footballers
FC Zirka Kropyvnytskyi players
F.C. Rieti players
French expatriate footballers
Expatriate footballers in Ukraine
French expatriate sportspeople in Ukraine
Ukrainian Premier League players
Serie C players
Expatriate footballers in Italy
Association football defenders
France youth international footballers
Livingston F.C. players
Scottish Professional Football League players
French expatriate sportspeople in Scotland
Expatriate footballers in Scotland
Footballers from Hauts-de-Seine